Benjamin Leopold Farjeon (12 May 1838 – 23 July 1903) was an English novelist, playwright, printer and journalist. As an author, he was known for his huge output.

Life
Farjeon was born in London to Dinah Levy and Jacob Farjeon, Orthodox Jews. He was raised in Whitechapel and had no formal secular education.

At 14, he entered the office of the Nonconformist, a Christian journal, to learn the printing trade. He broke away from the strict faith of his father and in 1854 emigrated to Australia. During the voyage he was moved from steerage to cabin class because he had produced some numbers of a ship newspaper, the Ocean Record.

Farjeon worked as a gold miner in Victoria (Australia), started a newspaper, then went to New Zealand in 1861. He settled in Dunedin, working as a journalist on the Otago Daily Times, edited by Julius Vogel, of which he became manager and sub-editor.

Farjeon began writing novels and plays, as a self-confessed disciple of Dickens, whose attention he managed to catch. In his novel Grif: A story of Australian life, for example, he modelled the Melbourne street Arab Grif on Jo in Bleak House. In 1868, he returned to Britain and lived in London in the Adelphi Theatre.

Over the next 35 years, Farjeon produced nearly 60 novels. Many of his works were illustrated by his long-time friend Nicholas Chevalier.

Benjamin Farjeon died in Hampstead on 23 July 1903, aged 65.

Family
Farjeon married Margaret Jane "Maggie" Jefferson (1853–1933), daughter of the American actor Joseph Jefferson, on 6 June 1877. He was the father of J. Jefferson Farjeon, Eleanor Farjeon, Herbert Farjeon, and Harry Farjeon.

Selected novels

Shadows on the Snow: A Christmas Story (1865)
Grif: a Story of Australian Life (1870)
Jessie Trim (1870)
Blade-o'-Grass: A Christmas Story (1871)
Joshua Marvel (1871)
London's Heart (1873)
Bread-and-Cheese and Kisses: A Christmas Story (1873)
Golden Grain (1874)
The King of No-Land (1875)
The Duchess of Rosemary Lane (1876)
An Island Pearl (1876)
At the Sign of the Silver Flagon (1880)
Great Porter Square: A Mystery (1884)
The House of White Shadows (1884)
Love's Harvest (1885)
The Sacred Nugget (1885)
In a Silver Sea (1886)
The Nine of Hearts (1886)
A Secret Inheritance (1887)
The Tragedy of Featherstone (1887)
Devlin the Barber (1888)
Toilers of Babylon (1888)
The Peril of Richard Pardon (1888)
Miser Fairbrother (1888)
The Mystery of M. Felix (1890)
For the Defense (1891)
The Blood White Rose (1891)
The Last Tenant (1893)
Something Occurred (1893)
Aaron the Jew (1894) (US title: A Fair Jewess)
Miriam Rozella (1898)
Samuel Boyd of Catchpole Square: A Mystery (1899)
The Mesmerists (1900)

Notes

References

 Additional sources listed by the Dictionary of Australian Biography:
 Eleanor Farjeon, A Nursery in the Nineties, which gives a charming account of Farjeon's happy married life
 E. Morris Miller, Australian Literature
 The Times, 24 July 1903; Who's Who, 1943
 Grove's Dictionary of Music and Musicians

External links
Herbert Farjeon archive at the University of Bristol Theatre Collection, University of Bristol
Shadows on the Snow: a Christmas story at NZetc website
Grif: a story of colonial life at NZetc website

1838 births
1903 deaths
19th-century English novelists
English Jewish writers
Benjamin
New Zealand journalists
People from Hampstead
Writers from Dunedin
People from Whitechapel
People from Victoria (Australia)
English male novelists
19th-century English male writers